Mark Albert Alessi (August 28, 1953 – March 29, 2019) was an American businessman who was the CEO of a number of companies, most notably as the founder of comic publisher CrossGen where he created a number of the titles.

Biography
Alessi's first major company was Technical Resource Connection, Inc, which he founded in 1986. He was CEO of this company until 1996, at which time the company was sold to Perot Systems Corporation. He later, in 1998, became founder and publisher of CrossGen comics, which subsequently liquidated in 2004 and the company and its assets were sold to Disney. He then became the CEO of TOA Solutions, Inc, a company that he founded in 2004. He died of a sudden massive coronary arrest on March 29, 2019, at the age of 65.

References

External links
 Interview: Mark Alessi of Crossgen: Running Comics Like A Business, The Trades, January 1, 2001
 CrossGen CEO Mark Alessi addresses company financial issues, Comic Book Resources, August 20, 2003
 Interview with CrossGen CEO Mark Alessi, icv2, August 25, 2003
 Interview with Mark Alessi, Dollar Bin, March 9, 2016

1953 births
2019 deaths
American publishers (people)
Comic book editors
Place of birth missing
Place of death missing